Katarina Srebotnik (born 12 March 1981) is a Slovenian retired professional tennis player. She reached her career-high singles ranking of world No. 20 on 7 August 2006. On 4 July 2011, she reached No. 1 of the WTA doubles rankings, holding this ranking for 10 weeks.

Srebotnik won four singles titles on the WTA Tour and was ranked inside the top 30 for several years. However, her best results have been on the doubles circuit, where she has won 39 WTA titles, including one Grand Slam title, at the 2011 Wimbledon Championships alongside Květa Peschke. She has also won five Grand Slam titles in mixed doubles, at the French Open in 1999, 2006 and 2010, the US Open in 2003 and the Australian Open in 2011.

Career

As a junior, she won the 1998 Wimbledon singles title and was runner-up at the US Open. Srebotnik was ranked No. 2 in the junior rankings in 1997 and 1998. She was mentored by Gabriela Sabatini.

1995–1999: WTA Tour debut and historic Guinness World record
Srebotnik made her debut on the ITF Women's Circuit in 1995, winning the singles tournaments in Ismailia in 1996, Zadar in 1997 and Šibenik in 1998. 

In 1998, Srebotnik won the doubles title on her WTA Tour debut at the Makarska Open (with Tina Križan), and later that year reached the doubles final at the Austrian Open, also with Tina Križan.

In 1999, her win at the ITF tournament in Dubai gave her direct entry into her first tour-level singles event in Estoril, where she became the fourth player to win on her tour debut, defeating Rita Kuti-Kis in the final. She broke into the top 100 on April 12, 1999 at No. 88.

In May 1999, Srebotnik played in her first Grand Slam singles main draw at Roland Garros, losing to Arantxa Sánchez Vicario in the second round. She won her first Grand Slam title in the mixed doubles with Piet Norval, becoming the first woman ever to win her first tour event in singles, doubles and mixed doubles. Only Mirjana Lučić had previously won on debut in both singles and doubles.

2000–2004
Srebotnik reached her first Tier-I semifinal in Tokyo at the Pan Pacific Open, which she lost to Sandrine Testud. On 7 February 2000, Srebotnik broke into the top 50 at No. 49. She won her fourth career doubles title at Estoril (with Tina Križan).

Srebotnik and Križan won their only doubles title of 2001 at Hawaii. They reached their biggest doubles final of their career in Toronto at the Canadian Open by defeating Martina Navratilova and Arantxa Sánchez Vicario in the semifinals, and they were doubles finalists at Estoril. They qualified for their debut doubles season-ending championships. Srebotnik reached a career-high doubles of No. 19 on 8 October.

In 2002, Srebotnik reached the finals at Bogotá (losing to Fabiola Zuluaga) and Acapulco (defeating Paola Suárez) in the final. She reached the fourth round at Roland Garros, which is her career-best Grand Slam. Srebotnik later achieved her then-best win at Los Angeles by defeating world No. 6, Kim Clijsters. She reached the semifinals in Luxembourg. She achieved her second appearance at the doubles season-ending championships with Krizan.

2003 saw Srebotnik reaching her fourth tour final at Palermo. She won the Bogotá doubles title with Asa Svensson, and reached her second Tier I quarterfinals in Toronto at the Canadian Open. She won her second Grand Slam mixed-doubles title at the US Open, this time with Bob Bryan.

Her 2004 season was highlighted by reaching the semifinals at Palermo and the quarterfinals at Strasbourg and Forest Hills.

Srebotnik won her seventh doubles title in Tokyo at the Japan Open (with Shinobu Asagoe).

2005
Her best season to date was highlighted by two singles and four doubles titles as well as a career-best victory over Amélie Mauresmo.

Srebotnik captured her third and fourth career WTA Tour singles titles at Auckland (defeating Shinobu Asagoe in the final, and she teamed with Asagoe for the doubles title) and in Stockholm (defeating world No. 14 Anastasia Myskina in the final and teaming with Émilie Loit for the doubles title).

She was the only player in 2005 to sweep singles and doubles titles twice. She also finished runner-up at Portorož, losing to Klára Zakopalová (now Koukalová) in three sets in the final. She also became runner-up in doubles with Jelena Kostanic.

Srebotnik reached the quarterfinals five times: at Tier II at Antwerp (lost to Anastasia Myskina), Tier I Charleston (losing to Elena Dementieva in three sets), Budapest (losing to Laura Pous Tió in a third set tie-break), Tier I Zurich (losing to Ana Ivanovic), and Hasselt (losing to Dinara Safina in a third set tie-break).

Her best finish in a major was a third-round loss at Wimbledon to Maria Sharapova.

A new career-high singles ranking of No. 28 came on 7 November.

In addition to Auckland and Stockholm, Srebotnik won doubles titles at Budapest and Hasselt (both with Émilie Loit). She reached the US Open mixed-doubles final (with Nenad Zimonjić, losing to Daniela Hantuchová and Mahesh Bhupathi).

2006
Srebotnik opened the 2006 season with an early exit at the Auckland Open. Two weeks later at the Australian Open, with partner Shinobu Asagoe, she made it to the semifinals in doubles, losing to Yan Zi and Zheng Jie. She won doubles titles in Antwerp (with Dinara Safina) and Amelia Island (with Shinobu Asagoe). At the French Open, she won the mixed doubles championship with Nenad Zimonjić.

At the US Open, she reached the doubles final partnering Dinara Safina. In Stuttgart, she reached the semifinals in doubles with Dinara Safina. At the Zurich Open, Srebotnik reached the semifinals of a Tier I tournament for the first time in six years (Pan Pacific Open, Japan). Also, Srebotnik and Liezel Huber reached the doubles final. In her final event of the season at the Linz Open, Srebotnik reached the doubles final with Corina Morariu.

2008
At the French Open, Srebotnik caused an upset when she defeated Serena Williams, whom she had never beaten in four previous attempts, in the third round. At the US Open in the same year, she upset former champion Svetlana Kuznetsova in the third round. On both occasions, she lost to Patty Schnyder in the next round.

2010
In that year, Srebotnik teamed with Květa Peschke, and won the WTA tournaments of Indian Wells (defeating Nadia Petrova and Sam Stosur in the final) and New Haven (defeating Bethanie Mattek-Sands and Meghann Shaughnessy), and reached the final of the WTA Championships in Doha.

Srebotnik had an excellent doubles outing at the French Open. In the ladies' doubles, she and Peschke defeated the second seeds Nuria Llagostera Vives and María José Martínez Sánchez in the semifinals, but lost to Serena and Venus Williams in the final. She also partnered with Nenad Zimonjić to win the mixed doubles title with a thrilling tiebreak win against Yaroslava Shvedova and Julian Knowle.

Srebotnik and Peschke reached the Rogers Cup doubles final. It was the second time this year that Srebotnik and Peschke reached a final of a Premier-5 tournament after Dubai in February.

At the end of the 2010 season, Srebotnik announced that she would focus on doubles for the remainder of her career.

2022: Retirement 
Although she played her last match at Rolland Garos in 2020, she was officially honored for her career in Portoroz in September 2022.

Major finals

Women's doubles: 5 (1–4)

Mixed doubles: 11 (5–6)

WTA career finals

Singles: 10 (4 titles, 6 runner-ups)

Doubles: 82 (39 titles, 43 runner-ups)

ITF Circuit finals

Singles: 9 (6–3)

Doubles: 22 (19–3)

Performance timelines

Singles

Doubles

Mixed doubles

 At the 2002 US Open, Srebotnik and Bob Bryan received a second-round walkover, this is not counted as a win.
 At the 2008 French Open, Srebotnik and Zimonjić received a semifinal walkover, this is not counted as a win.
 At the 2011 Australian Open, Srebotnik and Nestor received a quarterfinal walkover, this is not counted as a win.
 At the 2011 Wimbledon Championships, Srebotnik and Zimonjić withdrew before their third-round match, this is not counted as a loss.
 At the 2016 Wimbledon Championships, Srebotnik and Marcin Matkowski received a second-round walkover, this is not counted as a win.

Top 10 wins

Records
 In 2011, Srebotnik won seven titles (six in doubles, one in mixed doubles), more than any other player on the WTA Tour.

References

External links

 
 
 

1981 births
Living people
Slovenian female tennis players
French Open champions
US Open (tennis) champions
Olympic tennis players of Slovenia
Sportspeople from Slovenj Gradec
Tennis players at the 2000 Summer Olympics
Tennis players at the 2004 Summer Olympics
Tennis players at the 2012 Summer Olympics
Slovenian expatriate sportspeople in the United Arab Emirates
Australian Open (tennis) champions
Wimbledon champions
Wimbledon junior champions
Grand Slam (tennis) champions in women's doubles
Grand Slam (tennis) champions in mixed doubles
Grand Slam (tennis) champions in girls' singles
WTA number 1 ranked doubles tennis players
ITF World Champions